A salesman is someone who works in sales, with the main function of selling products or services to others either by visiting locations, by telephone, or in a store/shop, in which case other terms are also common, including retail clerk, salesperson, salesclerk, and shop assistant. 

Salesman may also refer to:

Films
 Salesman (1969 film), a 1969 film
 The Salesman (2011 film), a 2011 Canadian film
 The Salesman (2016 film), a 2016 Iranian film

Music
"Salesman", song by Stan Ridgway from The Big Heat (album)
"Salesman", song by The Monkees

See also
Death of a Salesman